Greenwood Independent School District is a public school district based in the community of Greenwood, Texas (USA). Greenwood ISD serves approximately 3,000 students. The district's mascot is the ranger/rangerette. As of 2015, Ariel Elliott is the superintendent.
In 2009, the school district was rated "academically acceptable" by the Texas Education Agency. 

It is entirely in unincorporated Midland County.

Schools
Greenwood High School (Grades 9-12) Principal: Stacy Jones
James R. Brooks Middle School (Grades 6-8) Principal: Kristi Griffin
Greenwood Intermediate School (Grades 3-5) Principal: Heather Bennett
Greenwood Elementary School (Grades PK-2) Principal: Leslie Goodrum

References

External links
Greenwood ISD

School districts in Midland County, Texas